Jann-Christopher George (born 31 July 1992) is a German professional footballer who plays as a forward for  club SpVgg Bayreuth.

Club career
George joined the 1. FC Nürnberg system at the age of nine and stayed with them until making his way to the U-23 team. After a conflict with Nürnberg's coaching staff, he left the club in the fall of 2012 and joined SpVgg Greuther Fürth in the summer of 2013. He made his first team debut in October 2014.

In summer 2015, he joined Jahn Regensburg.

After six years he transferred to Erzgebirge Aue in January 2022.

On 31 August 2022, George signed with newly promoted 3. Liga club SpVgg Bayreuth.

International career
The son of an African American serviceman and a German mother, George is eligible for both Germany and the United States. He has expressed an interest in representing the United States, and has been called up to the United States under-23 side.

References

External links
 
 

Living people
1992 births
Footballers from Nuremberg
German footballers
Association football forwards
2. Bundesliga players
3. Liga players
Regionalliga players
SpVgg Greuther Fürth players
SSV Jahn Regensburg players
FC Erzgebirge Aue players
SpVgg Bayreuth players
German people of American descent
German people of African-American descent